Genís García Junyent (born 7 June 1975), known simply as Genís, is a Spanish former footballer. Mainly a central defender, he could also operate as a defensive midfielder.

Club career
Born in Sabadell, Barcelona, Catalonia, Genís was a product of FC Barcelona's prolific youth ranks, La Masia. He could only play five matches for the reserves over the course of two Segunda División seasons, due to a severe knee injury.

Genís resumed his career in the Segunda División B with neighbouring club CE Sabadell FC, being an undisputed starter during most of his stay and eventually being named captain of the side. Due to constant physical ailments, now in the ankle, he was forced to retire in late 2005.

Personal life
Genís' brothers, Óscar and Roger, were also footballers. All youth products of Barcelona, they had however different fates as professionals, as his siblings went on to have relatively successful careers in La Liga, including with Barça's first team.

On 17 June 1997, during the final of the Copa Catalunya, all three appeared with the full side in a 3–1 loss against CE Europa.

References

External links

1975 births
Living people
Sportspeople from Sabadell
Spanish footballers
Footballers from Catalonia
Association football defenders
Segunda División players
Segunda División B players
Tercera División players
FC Barcelona C players
FC Barcelona Atlètic players
FC Barcelona players
CE Sabadell FC footballers
Spain youth international footballers